The Kuznetsov TV-022 was the first Soviet turboprop engine, designed by the Kuybyshev Engine Design Bureau.

Development
Development of the TV-022 began in 1947 at the State Union Experimental Plant No. 2 near Kuybyshev. A team of both Soviet and deported German engineers worked on the project. 

The TV-022 was based on the uncompleted Junkers Jumo 022 turboprop designed by Junkers during the later stages of World War II. 

Factory tests of the TV-022 took place in June 1949 and state tests where passed in October 1950. The TV-022 featured a reduction gearbox (i=0.145) for two coaxial contra-rotating AB-41 propellers. The engine was started with a 50 kW "Rut" air starter.

Modifications to the TV-022 resulted in the TV-2, which had more power (6,250 hp). The TV-2 was then further modified into the NK-12.

Specifications (TV-022)

See also

References

1940s turboprop engines
Kuznetsov aircraft engines